The thorny lanternshark (Etmopterus sentosus) is a shark of the family Etmopteridae found in the western Indian Ocean  between latitudes  0° and 31°S, at depths between 200 and 500 m.  Its length is up to 27 cm.

Reproduction is ovoviviparous.

References 

 
 Compagno, Dando, & Fowler, Sharks of the World, Princeton University Press, New Jersey 2005 

thorny lanternshark
Fish of Mozambique
Marine fauna of East Africa
thorny lanternshark